= Otter Bay =

Natural bay in Newfoundland and Labrador, Canada

Coordinates: 47.600°N 58.931°W

Otter Bay (Baie de la Loutre) is a natural bay on the island of Newfoundland in the province of Newfoundland and Labrador, Canada. Coney Bay is east of it.
