= Coney Bay =

Bay on the island of Newfoundland in Canada

Coordinates: 47.600°N 58.915°W

Coney Bay is a natural bay on the island of Newfoundland in the province of Newfoundland and Labrador, Canada. It is east of Otter Bay.
